The 4th South American Youth Championships in Athletics were held in Rio de Janeiro, Brazil from July 22–24, 1977.

Medal summary
Medal winners are published for boys and girls.
Complete results can be found on the "World Junior Athletics History" website.

Men

Women

Medal table (unofficial)

Participation (unofficial)
Detailed result lists can be found on the "World Junior Athletics History" website.  An unofficial count yields the number of about 202 athletes from about 8 countries:  

 (39)
 (4)
 (53)
 (36)
 (17)
 Perú (20)
 (20)

References

External links
World Junior Athletics History

South American U18 Championships in Athletics
Athletics
South American U18 Championships
International sports competitions in Rio de Janeiro (city)
International athletics competitions hosted by Brazil
Athletics in Rio de Janeiro (city)